Hemington is a village and former civil parish, now in the parish of Lockington-Hemington, in the North West Leicestershire district, in the county of Leicestershire, England. In 1931 the parish had a population of 298.

In 1790, the nearby Harrington Bridge was built to create a crossing of the River Trent. The new bridge was a toll bridge and everyone except locals living in Hemington or Sawley (in Derbyshire) were required to pay the toll.

Hemington was historically a township and chapelry in the parish of Lockington. It became a separate civil parish in 1866, but on 1 April 1936 the parish was abolished and merged with Lockington, on 14 May 1938 the parish was renamed Lockington Hemington.

Gravel quarrying at Hemington during the 1990s led to the discovery of three sets of remains from successive medieval bridges across the Trent.

Although there is not a rail station in the village, East Midlands Parkway opened early in 2008 at Ratcliffe-on-Soar providing links on the Midland Main Line.

References

External links

Villages in Leicestershire
Former civil parishes in Leicestershire
North West Leicestershire District